John Francis Moakley (December 11, 1863 – May 21, 1955) also known as Jack Moakley, was the track and cross-country coach at Cornell University from 1899 to 1949, and coached the United States Olympic track and field team in 1920. He was inducted into the National Track and Field Hall of Fame in 1988.

Biography
He was born on December 11, 1863, in Boston, Massachusetts and attended Boston Latin School. He started as the track and cross-country coach at Cornell University in 1899. He coached the United States track and field team in the 1920 Summer Olympics in Antwerp, Belgium. He retired from Cornell University in 1949. He died on May 21, 1955.

References

1863 births
1955 deaths
American track and field coaches
Cornell Big Red track and field coaches
1920 Summer Olympics
Cornell Big Red cross country coaches